The Green Film Network is an international association of environmental film festivals and was founded to support the work of international documentary filmmakers and promote films that raise awareness of environmental topics.

Green Film Network Award

The annual GFN Awards honor the most inspiring and impactful environmental films of the past year, exploring critical issues such as climate, food, energy, wildlife, and oceans. Films are nominated by 30 international film festivals that focus on environmental issues, and the winners are selected by an international jury. The awards ceremony is hosted at one of the GFN member festivals, rotating each year.

In February 2014, the network presented the inaugural Green Film Network Award as a new international award for best environmental documentary of the year. The first GFN Award was presented to filmmaker Reuben Aaronson for the documentary Amazon Gold during the opening ceremony of Fife Île-de-France (International Environmental Film Festival) in Paris on February 4.

In 2018, an award for Best Green Short was introduced.

The 2020 Awards included a special presentation ceremony on April 28, 2021, which took place online due to the ongoing COVID-19 pandemic. 43 films from 25 countries were nominated. A special one-time award was also presented for Best Film of the Decade 2010-2020.

Best Green Feature
2020 - Anthropocene: The Human Epoch directed by Jennifer Baichwal, Edward Burtynsky, and Nicholas de Pencier
2019 - Ghost Fleet directed by Shannon Service and Jeffrey Waldron
2018 - Genesis 2.0 directed by Christian Frei and Maxim Arbugaev
2017 - 24 Snow directed by Mikhail Barynin (joint winner)
2017 - Plastic China directed by Jiu-liang Wang (joint winner)
2016 - Landfill Harmonic directed by Brad Allgood and Graham Townsley
2015 - La Mujer y el Agua directed by Nocem Collado
2014 - Amazon Gold directed by Reuben Aaronson

Best Green Short
2020 - All Inclusive directed by Corina Schwingruber Ilić (joint winner)
2020 - Kofi and Lartey directed by Sasha Rainbow (joint winner)
2019 - Lost World directed by Kalyanee Mam
2018 - Water Warriors directed by Michael Premo

Best Green Film of the Decade
2020 - Racing Extinction directed by Louie Psihoyos

GFN Award Host Festivals
2020 - Online edition (due to COVID-19 pandemic)
2019 - CineEco, Seia, Portugal
2018 - San Francisco Green Film Festival, San Francisco, USA
2017 - Planet in Focus Film Festival, Toronto, Canada
2016 - Dominican Republic Environmental Film Festival, Santo Domingo, Dominican Republic
2015 - EcoZine Film Festival, Zaragoza, Spain
2014 - Festival International du Film d’Environnement, Paris, France

References

Green Film Network official website

Environmental film festivals
International environmental organizations
Documentary film organizations